Hellstrom or Hellström may refer to:

People with the name
 Hellström (surname)

In media
 Daimon Hellstrom, a Marvel Comics character
 Satana Hellstrom, a Marvel Comics character
 Hellstrom's Hive, a 1973 science fiction novel written by Frank Herbert
 The Hellstrom Chronicle, a 1971 film
 J. T. Hellstrom, fictional character on the CBS soap opera The Young and the Restless

See also
 Helstrom (disambiguation)